Events during the year 1100 in Italy.

Distillation of liquor is estimated to have been invented in Italy around the year 1100.

Deaths
 Antipope Clement III
 William IV, Marquess of Montferrat

Births
 Enrico Dandolo (patriarch)
 John of Meda

Sources

 Coulombe, Charles A., Vicars of Christ: A History of the Popes, (Kensington Publishing Corp.
Caravale, Mario (ed). Dizionario Biografico degli Italiani: LX Grosso – Guglielmo da Forlì. Rome, 2003.
Marchesi di Monferrato: Guglielmo IV.

References

Years of the 11th century in Italy
Italy
Italy